Mayfield Township is the name of some places in the U.S. state of Michigan:

 Mayfield Township, Grand Traverse County, Michigan
 Mayfield Township, Lapeer County, Michigan

See also 
 Mayfield, Michigan, an unincorporated community in Paradise Township, Grand Traverse County

Michigan township disambiguation pages